Cabangus noahi is a species of sea slug, a dendronotid nudibranch, a shell-less marine gastropod mollusc in the family Dendronotidae.

Distribution 
This species was described from the outer barrier reef off New Year’s Bay, Bagabag Island, Papua New Guinea.

Habitat
Cabangus noahi was found under coral on an exposed reef slope at 20 m depth.

References

Dendronotidae
Gastropods described in 2008